Dick Fowler may refer to:
Dick Fowler (baseball) (1921–1972), baseball pitcher
Dick Fowler (footballer) (born 1890), Australian footballer
Dick Fowler (politician) (1932–2012), former member of the Legislative Assembly of Alberta
John Richard Fowler (1927–2007), known as Dick, local politician in Memphis, Texas

See also
Richard Fowler (disambiguation)